The Duduble, also known as the Maxamuud Hiraab (Arabic: محمود هراب), is a Somali sub clan of the larger Hawiye. The Duduble like most Somali clans can trace their linage back to Samaale the oldest common father of major Somali clans.

Clan Tree and Distribution 
Presently, the Duduble is primarily represented in the regions of Galmudug and Banadir. The clan is closely linked and related to the Habr Gidr.

 The Hawiye
 Hiraab
 Duduble  
 Mohamed Amal 
 Habar Awradeen
 Maqlisame
 Ehli (Celi)
 Bisin
 Qadhoob
 Da'ud
 Habr Gidir
 Abgaal
 Mudulood
 Sheekhaal

History

Pre Colonial Era 

The Duduble are a subclan of Hiraab and born to an Ajuran mother. 

The Duduble tribe were historically ruled by a powerful chief Caaqil Siyaad Qaasim known as Caaqil Dheryodhoobe under 250 years ago or 8 generations ago in the Nugaal area before famous wars and droughts compelled some to move south to Central Somalia and elsewhere.

Colonial and Independence Era 

According to Italian colonial accounts, the Duduble largely lived north west of Mogadishu and between the city and Merca to the south.

In 1921, an Isaaq leader named Haji Muse Igarre, gave the Ugaas of Duduble approximately 10,000 rifles near Hobyo to fight Sultan Ali Yusuf Kenadid of the Sultanate of Hobyo. Former Governor of Ceel Buur District, Hussein A. Duale "Awil" recounted the story that was told to him years later by Duduble Sultan Farah Foodey:"We were not without fear and concern about the fight against Kenadid. He had a large army and gave us a lot of trouble. Ina Igarre promised the chiefs and elders of Hawiye that if Kenadids army was stronger, they would help with their army. That promise encouraged us a lot, it took away our fear and anxiety...The war lasted for ten days. On the tenth day, the King and his army surrendered. We took the King and his family into their hands."

Civil War

United Somali Congress, Somali National Alliance and Jubba Valley Alliance 

Following the outbreak of the Somali Civil War in 1991, the Duduble would primarily operate under the United Somali Congress (USC) and the later Somali National Alliance (SNA) factions. The clan would run the SNA's milita wing the SLA in Baidoa.

The clan would be part of the 11 July 1993, meeting of different sub clans within the SNA that was attempting to end the growing one month long war between the SNA and UNOSOM. Participating clans agreed to enter a political dialogue with UNOSOM II to end the conflict. The agreement would collapse following the deadly Abdi House raid that was carried out by U.S. forces on behalf of UNOSOM the next day.

On 12 September 1995 clashes between the Duduble and Ayr clan broke out in Mogadishu. According to witnesses the two sides traded heavy machine gunfire, antiaircraft missiles, and RPG-7 fire for about 90 minutes before clan elders intervened to halt the conflict.

In July 2001, the Duduble, Ayr, Murusade and sub clans within the Mareehan formed the Jubba Valley Alliance (JVA) in order to control the fertile regions surrounding the Jubba river.

Suuqa Holaha/Milk Factory Sharia Court 
Following the model of Sharia courts rising in Mogadishu in order to curb lawlessness, the Duduble would create and run their own Islamic Court in the city in the 1990s, operating under the title of the "Milk Factory Court" (Somali: Maxkamad Warshahada Canno) around Suuqa Holaha. The court had formed in 1992 but was unable to function until 1997 following Mohamed Farah Aidids death in 1996, due to his opposition to sharia courts. Ahmed Nuur Ali Jima’ale, CEO of Al-Barakat and a member of the Duduble, took the initiative along with other colleagues in creating the court. The institution brought together different religious groups, including Islamists, Salafis, and some religious leaders associated with Sufi orders. According to a Sheikh in the clan, the court would carry out capital punishments for murder but gave victim’s family a choice of whether to accept Diya or blood money (retaliatory compensation in Islamic law) and spare the life of the accused. If this was rejected an execution would be carried out.

Islamic Courts, Ethiopian Invasion of Somalia and Al-Shabaab

2000s 
By early 2001 the "Milk Factory" court had carried out a total of five executions.

When the Mogadishu sharia courts merged in 2000 and the Islamic Courts Union (ICU) formed, the Duduble would represent a core component of the organization. In 2006, members of the sub-clan controlled the finances of Mogadishu's seaport and international airport on behalf of the ICU. Despite the initial sharia courts being clan based, in 2006 Duduble ICU militia would reportedly decline certain appeals from Duduble elders, instead pointing to Islamic Courts Unions Supreme Council as the true authority.

While some members of the sub clan worked for the Transitional Federal Government of Somalia (TFG), overwhelmingly sympathies lay with Al-Shabaab as the TFG was widely viewed as an Ethiopian puppet and Al-Shabaab the only organized resistance to Ethiopian occupation. The Duduble and other Hawiye sub clans such as the Ayr and Murusade would represent the core of the resistance to the Ethiopian occupation of Mogadishu in 2007.

In the years following the fall of the Islamic Courts Union the Duduble would find itself at odds with the TFG, driven in large part by random detentions and summary executions of clan members and elders by TFG forces.

Abdullahi Isse Abtidon, a Duduble TFG member of parliament and a prominent religious leader who served with the ICU, would be assassinated on 15 April 2009, by suspected Al-Shabaab assassins. Abitdon had been using his influence to reach out to hardline islamists and the assassination was consequently considered a serious blow to reconciliation efforts between Islamist organizations and the TFG.

Following the Ethiopian withdrawal from Somalia in 2009, Ahmed Nur Ali Jumale, would control Bakara Market and its surrounding regions with a Duduble based militia.

2010s 
In December 2011, Duduble clan elders in El Buur would formally sign an agreement with Al-Shabaab to fight Ethiopian, Kenyan, TFG and AMISOM forces in Somalia."I advised all Somali tribes to support Al-Shabaab in defending our religion and our country. We have promised to fight both Ethiopian and Kenyan troops who entered our country"  - Sheikh Awale Mohamed Ali In June 2014, members of the clan (reportedly many of whom were civilians) would fight alongside Al-Shabaab against Ethiopian forces that had been deployed to El Buur following its capture by AMISOM forces in March of that year.

2020s 
Despite historically supporting Al-Shabaab against foreign forces and the former Transitional Federal Government, the Duduble is now involved in the fight against the organization.

Notable Figures 

Caaqil Dheryodhoobe - Historical Warrior Chief of Central Somalia and Strategist Thinker

 Lieutenant Colonel Iman Elman - Somali/Canadian woman presently serving in the Somali National Army.
 Ahmed Nuur Ali Jimaale - CEO of Al-Barakat.

References 

Somali clans
Hawiye clan